Zendejas is a surname. Notable people with the surname include:

Alex Zendejas, Mexican-American footballer
Cristian Zendejas (born 1999), American football player
Joaquin Zendejas (born 1960), American football player
Luis Zendejas (born 1961), American football player
Marty Zendejas (born 1964), American football player
Max Zendejas (born 1963), Mexican player of American football
Samadhi Zendejas (born 1994), Mexican actress
Tony Zendejas (born 1960), American football player